Novooleksandrivka is a village in Beryslav Raion (district) in Kherson Oblast of southern Ukraine, at about  northeast by east (NEbE) of Kherson. It hosts the administration of the Novooleksandrivka rural hromada, one of the hromadas of Ukraine.

The settlement came under attack by Russian forces during the Russian invasion of Ukraine in 2022  and was regained by Ukrainian forces by the beginning of October the same year.

Demographics
The settlement had 1,335 inhabitants in 2001, native language distribution as of the Ukrainian Census of the same year:
Ukrainian: 94.84%
Russian: 4.32%
Moldovan (Romanian): 0.15%
Belarusian: 0.08%
Armenian: 0.08%

References

Villages in Beryslav Raion